Trichocentrum silverarum is a type of orchid native to Panama. It was named after its discoverers, Gaspar Silvera and his daughter Katia Silvera. Originally described as Lophiaris silverarum, it is now placed within Trichocentrum.

References

Plants described in 2014
Cymbidieae